This was the first edition of the tournament.

Olga Govortsova won the title, defeating Claire Liu in the final, 6–4, 6–4.

Seeds

Draw

Finals

Top half

Bottom half

References

Main Draw

Kentucky Open - Singles